Palia is a village of Dildarnagar Kamsar located in Ghazipur District of Uttar Pradesh, India.

Histrorical Population

References

Villages in Ghazipur district